The Archdeacon of Armagh is a senior ecclesiastical officer within the Anglican Diocese of Armagh. The Archdeacon is responsible for the disciplinary supervision of the clergy  within the Diocese.

History

The archdeaconry can trace its history back to Luke Netterville who held the office in 1207. The current incumbent is Terry Scott. In between, some of them went on to higher office:
 Robert Luttrell, (also Treasurer of St. Patrick's Cathedral, Dublin, and later  Lord Chancellor of Ireland  c.1236-1246)
 John Vesey (later Archbishop of Tuam, 1679-1716)
 Charles Este (later Bishop of Ossory and Bishop of Waterford and Lismore
 Edward Stopford (later Bishop of Meath (1842-1850))
 Charles King Irwin (later Bishop of Limerick, Ardfert and Aghadoe (1934–1942) and Bishop of Down, Connor and Dromore (1942–1944))

References

 
Lists of Anglican archdeacons in Ireland
Religion in Northern Ireland
Diocese of Armagh (Church of Ireland)